Jaime Giménez Arbe (also spelled Jiménez: born Madrid, 12 January 1956) is a Spanish anarchist and bank robber known as El Solitario ("The Loner").

He admitted to more than thirty armed robberies of banks all over Spain, and was also convicted of the murder of two Civil Guards in Castejón (Navarra). In addition, in La Vall d'Uixó (Castellón)
, during an exchange of fire with El Solitario, one policeman died due to a stray bullet fired by another policeman. He was sentenced to 47 years' imprisonment in July 2008.

He has two sons with his British ex-wife Anne.

Detention
He was arrested on 23 July 2007, in Figueira da Foz (Portugal) as part of "Operation Gloria". A large number of police officers, both Spanish (National Police officers and Civil Guards from the Central Operational Unit) and Portuguese (Judiciary Police) were there to arrest him while he was, presumably, about to rob the “Caixa Agrícola” Bank, located on Saraiva de Carvalho Street, near the market. He was charged with the murder of two Civil Guards, whom he shot after they asked him to identify himself.{{

When he was arrested, he was disguised with false beard, mustache and wig and, as always, he wore his bulletproof vest and carried three guns: two short ones and an automatic one. The unprecedented police presence looking for him ended a decade of crimes that made him one of the most wanted criminals in Spanish criminal history. In his usual dwelling, and also in a warehouse of his own, large numbers of guns and amounts of ammunition were found, as well as articles of disguise.

He was taken to Coimbra, where he was to make a statement before a judge. At the court door, before the many curious people and the media, he shouted "Hola a todos, soy El Solitario. ¡Salud españoles!" ("Hi, everyone. I’m The Loner. Here’s to you, Spain!")

Stay in prison
On 27 July 2007 he started a hunger strike as a protest against being moved to a high security level prison. He stopped the protest two days later.

According to his lawyers, Portuguese Elisa Maia and Spanish José Mariano Trillo-Figueroa in an August 2007 press-conference, he admitted being a robber, but denied having murdered the three people of whose deaths he is accused, claiming that the former Civil Guard General Enrique Rodríguez Galindo, and the former President of the Regional Government of Extremadura Juan Carlos Rodríguez Ibarra were involved in the shooting of a shepherd in Zafra. and stating "I am innocent of the death of the two civil guards of Castejón and of a municipal policeman of Vall D "Uixó. It is my word of honor. I am not a murderer and if I have been forced to shoot law enforcement officers it has always been against my will and to avoid my arrest." He also admitted the robberies, stating "I robbed banks in order to liberate the Spanish from the banks’ thefts".

Trial
During his trial in the Navarra Provincial High Court in July 2008, Jaime Giménez Arbe pleaded not guilty to the charge of murder of two Civil Guards, as well as declaring himself antisystem and anarchist and defining his robberies as “bank expropriation”. He also said he had started his criminal career with Corsican anti-capitalist groups, with which he committed his first robbery. Those sworn statements are similar to the ones in the letter he wrote in a letter to “public opinion” during his stay in Zuera prison.

He was found guilty of the murder in 2004 of the two Civil Guards, and was sentenced to 47 years' imprisonment.

Criminal record

Representations in media 

 Soy El Solitario (I am The Loner) is a Spanish TV-miniseries by Manuel Ríos San Martín based on the investigation that lead to the arrest of Arbe.
 Me llaman el Solitario: autobiografía de un expropiador de bancos is an autobiography by Arbe with foreword by Lucio Urtubia. published in 2009.

Notes

References 

Living people
1956 births
Spanish anarchists
Spanish anti-capitalists
Spanish bank robbers
People from Madrid
Spanish people convicted of murdering police officers